, also known as Electric Discharge & Me, is a compilation album by Japanese singer and songwriter Ringo Sheena. It features most of her B-sides and rarer songs from her solo era, and was released to celebrate her 10th anniversary in the industry.
The music video collection DVD "" was released on the same day.

Outline
The songs were either not featured in previous full albums, or were at least non-album versions. However, not all non-album songs were released in this compilation.

The music video of "Mellow" was produced for this release. The clip was recorded the DVD "Watashi no Hatsuden".

Track listing
All tracks written by Ringo Sheena, except where noted.

References 

Ringo Sheena albums
2008 compilation albums